The Lagos State Ministry of Tourism and Inter-Governmental Relations is the state government ministry, charged with the responsibility to plan, devise and implement the state policies on tourism and inter-governmental relations.

See also
Lagos State Ministry of Home Affairs and Culture
Lagos State Executive Council

References

Government ministries of Lagos State
Lagos